Clifden railway station was a station serving the town of Clifden, County Galway, Ireland. It closed in 1935.

History
The station was the terminus on the Clifden branch line from  some  distant. An inspection train of directors reached the station on 3 May 1895, with the public opening on 1 July 1895.   

When the last train pulled out of Clifden in 1935 with the closure of the railway it left with whistle blowing and detonators set at the level crossing. The station building has since being renovated and now a theatre.   The station master's house is now a Museum.

References

Footnotes

Sources
 
 

Disused railway stations in County Galway
Railway stations opened in 1895
Railway stations closed in 1935